I Need Mine is the third full-length studio album (fourth overall) by Houston rapper Lil' Flip, released on March 27, 2007. The album features appearances from Mike Jones, Lyfe Jennings, Big Pokey, Lil' Keke, Nate Dogg, and Mannie Fresh, among others. It consists of 37 songs on 2 discs. The album also debuted at #15 on the Billboard 200 with 45,000 copies sold in the first week released.

Critical reception

I Need Mine received generally positive reviews from music critics. Nathan Slavik of DJBooth praised Flip for expressing different characters throughout the double album while still being able to deliver solid enough hustle skills in his delivery, concluding that "In the end, I Need Mine finds the Cloverland legend constantly flipping between his different personalities: the street soldier, the honey lovin player, and the socially conscious commentator. The true hip-hop legends manage to be all three at once (a.k.a. Biggie and Tupac), and Lil’ Flip has the skills to join their ranks, he’s just more concerned with getting his first." Pedro Hernandez of RapReviews praised the album for scaling back on the humor to allow for diverse topics and sharp production, calling it "Lil' Flip's best album to date and yet it isn't. Even with the scarcity of humor on the album, if you put all the best songs on the double disc together you would have Flip's best album." Andrew Beaujon of Blender felt that a discord was found between the production and Flip's lyrics, saying that "The beats are often dazzling, the rhymes less so. His disses in particular need a little work."

Track listing

Disc 1

Disc 2

Charts

References

2007 albums
Lil' Flip albums
Asylum Records albums
Warner Records albums
Albums produced by Scott Storch
Albums produced by Salaam Remi
Albums produced by Mannie Fresh